Antonio Sciesa was one of four s built for the  (Royal Italian Navy) during the late 1920s. She played a minor role in the Spanish Civil War of 1936–1939 supporting the Spanish Nationalists.

Design and description
They displaced  surfaced and  submerged. Their crew numbered 77 officers and enlisted men.

For surface running, the boats were powered by two  diesel engines, each driving one propeller shaft. When submerged each propeller was driven by a  electric motor.

The boats were armed with six internal  torpedo tubes, four in the bow and two in the stern, for which they carried a dozen torpedoes. They were also armed with a single  deck gun, forward of the conning tower, for combat on the surface. Their anti-aircraft armament consisted of two  machine guns.

Construction and career
Antonio Sciesa was laid down by Odero-Terni-Orlando at their Muggiano shipyard on 20 October 1925, launched on 12 August 1928 and completed on 12 April 1929. During the Spanish Civil War she unsuccessfully attacked two ships during a patrol off Alicante on 6–20 August 1937.

See also
 Italian submarines of World War II

References

Bibliography

External links
 Antonio Sciesa Marina Militare website

Balilla-class submarines
World War II submarines of Italy
1928 ships
Ships built in La Spezia
Ships built by OTO Melara